Natalia Alessandra Padilla Bidas (born 6 November 2002) is a Spanish-born Polish footballer who plays as a forward for Swiss Women's Super League club Servette FC and the Poland women's national team.

Early life
Padilla was born in Málaga to an American father of Spanish descent and a Polish mother. Her paternal grandmother was born in Morocco and emigrated to Spain.

Club career
Padilla has played for Málaga CF in Spain and for Servette in Switzerland.

International career
Padilla made her senior debut for Poland on 13 April 2021 in a 2–4 friendly home loss to Sweden.

International goals

References

2002 births
Living people
Citizens of Poland through descent
Polish women's footballers
Women's association football forwards
Servette FC Chênois Féminin players
Swiss Women's Super League players
Poland women's international footballers
Polish expatriate footballers
Polish expatriate sportspeople in Switzerland
Expatriate women's footballers in Switzerland
Polish people of American descent
Polish people of Spanish descent
Polish people of Moroccan descent
Footballers from Málaga
Spanish women's footballers
Málaga CF Femenino players
Segunda Federación (women) players
Spanish expatriate footballers
Spanish expatriate sportspeople in Switzerland
Spanish people of American descent
Spanish sportspeople of Moroccan descent
Spanish people of Polish descent